Alfonso Joseph Zirpoli (April 12, 1905 – July 10, 1995) was a United States district judge of the United States District Court for the Northern District of California.

Early life

Born in Denver, Colorado, Zirpoli received an Artium Baccalaureus degree from the University of California, Berkeley in 1926 and a Juris Doctor from the UC Berkeley School of Law in 1928.

Career 
He was in private practice in San Francisco, California from 1928 to 1932. He was an assistant district attorney of the City and County of San Francisco from 1932 to 1933, and an Assistant United States Attorney of the Northern District of California from 1933 to 1944. He returned to private practice in San Francisco from 1944 to 1961, also serving on the San Francisco Board of Supervisors from 1958 to 1961.

During his time as an attorney, he represented death row inmates pro bono.

Federal judicial service

On September 14, 1961, Zirpoli was nominated by President John F. Kennedy to a new seat on the United States District Court for the Northern District of California created by 75 Stat. 80. He was confirmed by the United States Senate on September 21, 1961, and received his commission the following day.

Zirpoli broadened the rights of conscientious objector in during the Vietnam War draft, which prompted President Richard Nixon to call him "the worst judge on the Federal Bench."

During the Zebra murders, over 600 black men were stopped by the police due to the ambiguous descriptors provided by witnesses. In a motion filed by the NAACP and the American Civil Liberties Union, Zirpoli ruled that the police's stop and search program was unconstitutional and halted it. The order said that the police must have supporting evidence that arouses reasonable suspicion before stopping suspects and that stopping people solely due to purported similarities to the witnesses' description is forbidden.

He assumed senior status on September 30, 1975, serving in that capacity until his death on July 10, 1995, in San Francisco.

Personal life 
Zirpoli was a life long Democrat, having worked on every Democratic presidential campaign between 1928 and 1960. He was married to Giselda Zirpoli. They had two daughters.

References

Sources
 

1905 births
1995 deaths
San Francisco Board of Supervisors members
Lawyers from San Francisco
Judges of the United States District Court for the Northern District of California
United States district court judges appointed by John F. Kennedy
20th-century American lawyers
UC Berkeley School of Law alumni
20th-century American judges
Assistant United States Attorneys